Warren Z. Cole House, now known as Indenhofen Farm and also known as the Kidder-De Haven House, is a historic home located in Evansburg State Park at Skippack, Montgomery County, Pennsylvania, USA. It was built in 1725, and is a -story, brownstone dwelling, four bays wide and two bays deep. It features gable end chimneys and a steep shingled gable roof. The property also includes a summer kitchen and bake oven and a Swiss / German bank barn.  The property was restored and is open to the public by the Skippack Historical Society.

It was added to the National Register of Historic Places in 1973.

References

External links
Skippack Historical Society: Indenhofen Farm

German-American culture in Pennsylvania
Historic house museums in Pennsylvania
Houses on the National Register of Historic Places in Pennsylvania
Houses completed in 1725
Houses in Montgomery County, Pennsylvania
Museums in Montgomery County, Pennsylvania
Swiss-American culture in Pennsylvania
1725 establishments in Pennsylvania
National Register of Historic Places in Montgomery County, Pennsylvania